Arthur Cleave (9 April 1884–2 December 1939) was a British actor.

He died in London aged 55 and was buried in Brompton Cemetery in London.

Selected filmography
 The Romance of Old Bill (1918)
 The Lady Clare (1919)
 Garryowen (1920)
 Nothing Else Matters (1920)
 The Bachelor's Club (1921)
 Mary Find the Gold (1921)
 The Adventures of Mr. Pickwick (1921)
 The Card (1922)
 A Master of Craft (1922)
 Old Bill Through the Ages (1924)
 Her Redemption (1924)

References

External links
 

1884 births
1939 deaths
English male film actors
English male silent film actors
People from Ilfracombe
Male actors from Devon
20th-century English male actors
 Burials at Brompton Cemetery